German submarine U-513 was a type IXC U-boat built for service in Nazi Germany's Kriegsmarine during World War II.

She was laid down on 26 April 1941 by the naval construction firm Deutsche Werft AG in Hamburg as yard number 309, and commissioned on 10 January 1942. Her commanders were Korvettenkapitän Rolf Rüggeberg (10 January 1942 until 14 May 1943) and Kapitänleutnant Friedrich Guggenberger (15 May until 19 July 1943). Her training period was from 10 January 1942 to 31 August, as part of the 4th U-boat Flotilla. She was then assigned to the 10th U-boat Flotilla for operations.

The boat was a member of two wolfpacks. She was sunk by depth charges from a U.S. Martin PBM Mariner amphibious aircraft in the South Atlantic Ocean on 19 July 1943.

The find was announced worldwide on 17 June 2011, when the Schürmanns produced images of a Side-scanning sonar. A dive was made in 2012, where photos and video images were recorded.

Design
German Type IXC submarines were slightly larger than the original Type IXBs. U-513 had a displacement of  when at the surface and  while submerged. She had two shafts and two  propellers.

U-513 was fitted with six  torpedo tubes (four fitted at the bow and two at the stern), 22 torpedoes, one  SK C/32 naval gun, 180 rounds, and a  SK C/30 as well as a  C/30 anti-aircraft gun. The boat had a complement of forty-eight.

Service history

First patrol
U-513s first patrol began when she departed Kiel on 7 August 1942 and headed for the Atlantic by way of the gap between Iceland and the Faeroe Islands. Her first two successes came in Conception Bay near Bell Island, Newfoundland on 5 September. She arrived in Lorient, in occupied France on 22 October.

Second and third patrols
The second and third sorties took her into the mid-Atlantic, but she returned to her French base empty-handed. Her last sortie ended in April 1943. Thereafter her captain, Rolf Rüggeberg, was replaced with the young captain Friedrich Guggenberger who in January 1943 had been awarded the Knight's Cross with Oak Leaves.

Fourth patrol
Her fourth and last foray began 18 May 1943 and saw her close to the Brazilian coast. After five attacks resulting in four ships sunk and one damaged, she was sunk southeast of São Francisco do Sul, Santa Catarina state on 19 July 1943 by a US Navy Mariner, nicknamed "The Nickel Boat", led by Lt. (jg) Roy S. Whitcomb, from Patrol Squadron VP-74. 46 men died; there were seven survivors, including her captain, Friedrich Guggenberger.

Wolfpacks
U-513 took part in two wolfpacks, namely: 
 Unverzagt (12 – 19 March 1943) 
 Seeräuber (25 – 30 March 1943)

Summary of raiding history

Discovery
The search for U-513 was conducted with a sail boat and took two years. Another 10 German submarines remained to be discovered in Brazilian coastal waters.

U-513 Found/Underwater Footage
A Brazilian project searched Brazilian waters for the sunken U-513. She was finally found in 2011, and the first underwater videos of the boat were released in March 2012.

In 2014, a one-hour TV documentary on the history of this voyage featuring film from the era and the submarine's final resting place titled: The Ghost of U-513 was released and has been shown on the Smithsonian Channel.  It includes details from the life of captain Friedrich Guggenberger who survived the sinking and the war.

References

Bibliography

External links

World War II shipwrecks in the Atlantic Ocean
World War II shipwrecks in the South Atlantic
German Type IX submarines
World War II submarines of Germany
U-boats sunk by US aircraft
U-boats commissioned in 1942
1941 ships
U-boats sunk in 1943
U-boats sunk by depth charges
Ships built in Hamburg
Maritime incidents in July 1943